Judith DuBose (1698 - 16 December 1769) was a Colonial American heiress. Born into a prominent French Huguenot family of planters, DuBose married Joseph Wragg, a prominent slave trader in British North America.

Biography 
DuBose was born at Dockon, her family's plantation near Charles Town. She was the daughter of Marie DeGuè and Jacques DuBose, a French Huguenot immigrant and wealthy planter. After her father died, her mother remarried John Thomas. She was named as one of her stepfather's heirs, along with her sisters, at the time of his death.

She married Joseph Wragg, a British slave trader. One of their daughters, Elizabeth, married Peter Manigault, who was the wealthiest man in British North America. Another daughter, Mary, married the slave trader and merchant Benjamin Smith. A third daughter, Henrietta, married her first cousin, William Wragg.

She was painted by the portraitist Henrietta Johnston in 1719. The painting is on display at the Gibbes Museum of Art.

DuBose died in 1769 and is buried in the cemetery at St. Philip's Episcopal Church.

References 

1698 births
1769 deaths
American people of French descent
Colonial American women
South Carolina colonial people
Spouses of South Carolina politicians
Wragg family